Night and No Morning (German: Die Nacht ohne Morgen) is a 1921 German silent drama film directed by Karl Grune and starring Eugen Klöpfer, Hans Mierendorff and Hanni Weisse. It premiered in Berlin on 17 August 1921.

Cast
 Eugen Klöpfer as Mac Chifford 
 Hans Mierendorff as Lawyer Coborn 
 Hanni Weisse as Frau Chifford
 Albert Steinrück as Zirkusdirektor Mortera 
 Grit Hegesa as Frau Mortera 
 Edgar Klitzsch as Varieté-Agent 
 Paul Rehkopf as Artist 
 Ludwig Rex  
 Ferdinand Robert   
 Franz Verdier

References

Bibliography
 Grange, William. Cultural Chronicle of the Weimar Republic.Scarecrow Press, 2008.

External links

1921 films
Films of the Weimar Republic
German silent feature films
German drama films
Films directed by Karl Grune
1921 drama films
German black-and-white films
Silent drama films
1920s German films